Kamenka is a rural locality (a village) in Meselinsky Selsoviet, Aurgazinsky District, Bashkortostan, Russia. The population was 66 as of 2010. There is 1 street.

Geography 
Kamenka is located 33 km south of Tolbazy (the district's administrative centre) by road. Krasny Vostok is the nearest rural locality.

References 

Rural localities in Aurgazinsky District